Crooked Creek is a stream in Johnson and Pettis counties of the U.S. state of Missouri. It is a tributary of Muddy Creek.

The stream flows generally due north parallel to the county line and routes B and AA past the community of Owsley. The stream veers west into Johnson County for the last half mile before entering Muddy Creek at  about three miles southeast of Whiteman Air Force Base.
 
Crooked Creek was so named due to the frequent meanders along its course.

See also
List of rivers of Missouri

References

Rivers of Johnson County, Missouri
Rivers of Pettis County, Missouri
Rivers of Missouri